Craig Taborn is a pianist, keyboard and electronics player, chiefly in jazz. By the end of 2020, he had appeared on 14 albums as a leader or co-leader and more than 100 as a sideman.

As leader/co-leader

An asterisk (*) after the year indicates that it is the year of release.

As sideman

An asterisk (*) after the year indicates that it is the year of release.

Remixes

Sources: and others.

References

Jazz discographies
Discographies of American artists